Ștefănești is a town in Argeș County, Muntenia, Romania. The town administers seven villages: Enculești, Golești, Izvorani, Ștefăneștii Noi, Valea Mare-Podgoria, Viișoara and Zăvoi.

Natives
Dinu Brătianu
Ion I. C. Brătianu
Vintilă Brătianu
Dănuț Coman
Dinicu Golescu
Leonard Manole
Florentin Nicolae
George Olteanu

References

Populated places in Argeș County
Localities in Muntenia
Towns in Romania